Robert James Moon (1911–1989) was an American physicist, chemist and engineer. A graduate of the University of Chicago, he served on the faculty there and participated in the Manhattan Project.

References

External links
 Who Was Robert J. Moon? https://21sci-tech.com/articles/drmoon.html 21st Century Science & Technology
 University of Chicago Photo Archive, Accelerator Building http://photoarchive.lib.uchicago.edu/db.xqy?one=apf2-00146.xml
 Interview: Robert Moon. Part I. 'We grew up confident we could solve any problem.' https://larouchepub.com/eiw/public/1987/eirv14n43-19871030/eirv14n43-19871030_031-dr_robert_moon.pdf  Executive Intelligence Review, Vol. 14, No. 43, Oct. 30, 1987.
 Interview: Robert Moon. Part II. New hypothesis shows geometry of atomic nucleus. Executive Intelligence Review, Vol. 14, No. 44, Nov. 6, 1987. https://larouchepub.com/eiw/public/1987/eirv14n44-19871106/eirv14n44-19871106_018-dr_robert_moon.pdf
 Hecht, Laurence. The Geometric Basis for the Periodicity of the Elements. https://www.yumpu.com/en/document/view/31206913/the-geometry-the-nucleus 21st Century Science & Technology, May-June 1988, pp. 18-30.
 Continuing the Legacy of Dr. Robert J. Moon. https://21sci-tech.com/Subscriptions/Archive/2004_F.pdf 21st Century Science & Technology. Fall 2004, pp. 8-77.

1911 births
1989 deaths
20th-century American physicists
University of Chicago faculty
University of Chicago alumni
Manhattan Project people